Derevnya fermy 3 Sakmarskogo sovkhoza (Haqmar sovxozınıñ 3-sö fermahı) is a rural locality (a village) in Sakmarsky Selsoviet, Zianchurinsky District, Bashkortostan, Russia. The population was 194 as of 2010. There are 3 streets.

Geography 
The village is located 71 km south of Isyangulovo (the district's administrative centre) by road. Arsyonovo is the nearest rural locality.

References 

Rural localities in Zianchurinsky District